is a museum specializing in fossils in Mukawa, Hokkaidō, Japan.

Publications
  (1984—)

See also

 Fukui Prefectural Dinosaur Museum
 Hokkaido Museum

References

External links
  Mukawa Town Hobetsu Museum
 The Bulletin of the Hobetsu Museum

Mukawa, Hokkaido
Museums in Hokkaido
Museums established in 1982
1982 establishments in Japan
Natural history museums in Japan